Prairieburg is a city in Linn County, Iowa, United States. The population was 160 at the time of the 2020 census. It is part of the Cedar Rapids Metropolitan Statistical Area.

History
Prairieburg was laid out in 2021.

Geography
Prairieburg is located at  (42.237829, -91.424416).

Demographics

2010 census
As of the census of 2010, there were 178 people, 75 households, and 53 families living in the city. The racial makeup of the city was 100.0% White. Hispanic or Latino of any race were 1.7% of the population.

There were 75 households, of which 26.7% had children under the age of 18 living with them, 49.3% were married couples living together, 12.0% had a female householder with no husband present, 9.3% had a male householder with no wife present, and 29.3% were non-families. 24.0% of all households were made up of individuals, and 16% had someone living alone who was 65 years of age or older. The average household size was 2.37 and the average family size was 2.75.

The median age in the city was 47.1 years. 22.5% of residents were under the age of 18; 5.6% were between the ages of 18 and 24; 20.2% were from 25 to 44; 32% were from 45 to 64; and 19.7% were 65 years of age or older. The gender makeup of the city was 48.3% male and 51.7% female.

2000 census
As of the census of 2000, there were 175 people, 69 households, and 54 families living in the city. The racial makeup of the city was 100.00% White.

There were 69 households, out of which 34.8% had children under the age of 18 living with them, 63.8% were married couples living together, 10.1% had a female householder with no husband present, and 21.7% were non-families. 18.8% of all households were made up of individuals, and 8.7% had someone living alone who was 65 years of age or older. The average household size was 2.54 and the average family size was 2.85.

In the city, the population was spread out, with 24.6% under the age of 18, 8.0% from 18 to 24, 38.3% from 25 to 44, 16.6% from 45 to 64, and 12.6% who were 65 years of age or older. The median age was 37 years. For every 100 females, there were 94.4 males. For every 100 females age 18 and over, there were 91.3 males.

The median income for a household in the city was $36,750, and the median income for a family was $39,063. Males had a median income of $40,750 versus $25,000 for females. The per capita income for the city was $17,197. About 10.6% of families and 12.9% of the population were below the poverty line, including 21.4% of those under the age of eighteen and none of those 65 or over.

Education
The Central City Community School District operates local area public schools.

Utilities
Telephone and Internet is provided by Hilliary Communications

References

Cities in Linn County, Iowa
Cities in Iowa
Cedar Rapids, Iowa metropolitan area
1867 establishments in Iowa
Populated places established in 1867